Kaare Espolin Johnson (March 7, 1907 – August 16, 1994) was a Norwegian artist and illustrator.

Life and work
Espolin Johnson was born at the Vasseng farm in Surnadal. In 1909, when he was two years old, his family moved to Vadsø, and then moved again to Bodø in 1919. In 1927, after spending some time in Horten, Espolin Johnson relocated to Oslo, where he studied at the Norwegian National Academy of Craft and Art Industry and Norwegian National Academy of Fine Arts under Axel Revold and Halfdan Strøm. There he developed a special layering and scraping technique using soot early on in almost exclusively black and white. He had poor eyesight, and this technique was very well suited for his limited vision.

He debuted at the Autumn Exhibition in 1932 and soon started contributing illustrations to the magazine Arbeidermagasinet. Espolin Johnson also illustrated many books, among which the first was Vett og uvett. Stubber fra Troms og Nordland (Sense and Nonsense: Short Stories from Troms and Nordland, 1942) by  Einar Kristoffer Aas and Peter Wessel Zapffe. His motifs were based on northern Norwegian fishing life, and continued with motives from rural life to the south. Examples of this include his illustrations for Sigbjørn Hølmebakk's Fimbulvinter (The Great Winter, 1964), Regine Normann's Ringelihorn og andre eventyr (Ringelihorn and Other Tales, 1967), and Johan Bojer's Den siste viking (The Last Viking, 1972).

Espolin Johnson also decorated the Coastal Express vessel MS Harald Jarl (1960) with several motifs from Petter Dass's Nordlands Trompet. These paintings were transferred to the new Coastal Express vessel MS Trollfjord when MS Harald Jarl was sold. In addition, he decorated the Kirkenes police station (in 1964), the county hospital in Ålesund (in 1973), and the telegraph station in Sandnessjøen (in 1975).

In an interview with NRK TV in connection with the opening of the Espolin Gallery in 1992, Espolin Johnson stated that, when he looked back at his artistic work, it was the illustrations for Vett og Uvett and Bojer's Den siste viking that gave him the most pleasure. He highlighted the Baroque humor in Vett og Uvett as one of the reasons why he had enjoyed that task in particular.

Espolin Johnson received the Nordland County Culture Prize in 1990. He is represented in Norway's National Museum of Art, Architecture and Design by 39 of his artworks.

Literature
A biography of Espolin Johnson was written by Arne Durban in 1979. In 1994, together with Arthur Arntzen, Espolin Johnson coauthored the book Og langsomt kom lyset (And Slowly Came the Light), which discusses Northern Norway and its art, with 22 of his own works in focus.

To mark the centenary of the birth of Espolin Johnson, in 2007 Pax Forlag issued a new and expanded edition of Bjørn Tore Pedersen's volume Kaare Espolin Johnson – Lengselens billeddikter (Kaare Espolin Johnson: The Visual Poet of Longing).

Espolin Gallery
The Espolin Gallery was established in 1992 in Kabelvåg in the municipality of Vågan, which received 40 to 50 of Espolin Johnson's works in 1983. The collection contains nearly 170 works.

Illustrations by Espolin Johnson

Books illustrated
 Einar K. Aas and Peter Wessel Zapffe: Vett og uvett. 1942 (plus various new editions)
 Henrik Wergeland: Vesle-Hans. 1945
 Hans Henrik Holm: Vårhelg i Gaukleikleiv. 1947 (with Tore Deinboll)
 Hans Henrik Holm: Fugl Føniks i eplehagen. 1948 (with Tore Deinboll)
 Øivind Bolstad: Spøkefuglen på Toska. 1955
 Sigbjørn Hølmebakk: Fimbulvinteren. 1964
 Olav Nordrå: Herr Petters trompet. 1964
 Olav Nordrå: Jeg hilser jorden. 1965
 Regine Normann: Ringelihorn og andre eventyr. 1967
 Ole Barman: Draumen og andre noveller. 1968
 Den fyrste song. Antologi over norske voggesongar. 1968
 Hans Johan Bjørnstad: Av lofotfiskerens saga. 1970
 Roar Petersen: Sånn kan det gå. 1970
 Johan Bojer: Den siste viking. 1972
 Hans Johan Bjørnstad: Jeg kjente et land. 1976
 Ut mot hav. Nordland fylkes fiskarlag. 1977
 Før oss 1. Noveller fra eldre barnelitteratur, with Sonja Hagemann. 1977
 Arne Durban: Kaare Espolin Johnson. 1979
 Hans Johan Bjørnstad: ... men kirkesangeren var pennefør. 1979
 Før og nå. Nynorsk litteratur fra Sivle til Sagen. 1980
 Peter Christen Asbjørnsen and Jørgen Moe: Det var en gang… 1981
 Lofotboka. 1982
 I storm og stilla. Nordland fylkes fiskarlag. 1982
 Barnas beste: i gamle dager. 1983
 Skolp: årbok for Vågan. 1984
 Ord for andre: antologi til inntekt for de sultrammede i Etiopia. 1985
 Reidar Hirsti: Grenseløse mennesker. 1987
 Pomorhandelen. Einar Niemi (ed.) 1992
 Årbok for Vågan. 1995
 Kaare Espolin Johnson: Grafikk. 1997
 Kaare Espolin Johnson and Arthur Arntzen: Og langsomt kom lyset. 1994
 Kaare Espolin Johnson: Skisser og forelskelser. 2002
 Bjørn Tore Pedersen: Lengselens billeddikter. 2000
 Linda Lillevik: Eventyrlige Espolin: glimt fra et kunstnerliv. 2007
 Å låne øyne å se med. Aaslaug Vaa (ed.). 2007
 Vær hilset: Espolin i 100 år. Wenche Thorunn Nilsen. (ed.). 2007

Cover illustrations
 Andreas Haukland: Landeveiens folk. 1933
 Helge Holst: Huset på grensen. 1933
 Franz Kafka: Prosessen. 1934
 Gisken Wildenway: Andrine og Kjell. 1934
 Øivind Bolstad: De gyldne lenker. 1934
 Sven Nilsen: Et menneske kommer til verden. 1934
 John Dos Passos: Cirkus Verdensteater. 1934
 Nils Johan Rud: Så stjeler vi et fattighus. 1934
 Herman Lundsrud: Vi som ikke er mennesker. 1935
 Bjørn Rongen: Nettenes natt. 1940
 Leif Ytteren: Trollfjell. 1944
 Stephen Wendt: Min elskede, husker du? 1951
 Seymour Shubin: Fienden i meg selv. 1955
 Emil Boysen: Gjenkjennelse. 1957
 Norge i nord. Den norske turistforening. 1963
 Olav Nordrå: Guds ulver. 1967
 Alf Larsen: Siste strofer. 1969
 Johan Bojer: Folk ved sjøen. 1977
 Johan Bojer: Vår egen stamme. 1977
 Per Fugelli: Bruk av legemidler på Værøy og Røst. 1978
 Lofotboka. 1979
 Arvid Hanssen: Søsken på Guds jord. 1981
 Arvid Møller: Losen på Tranøy. 1983
 Randi Folkestad: Tangsforretningen. 1985
 Liv Marie Austrem: Gyda. 1995
 Lars Hermansen: Exercise in Human Physiology. 1986
 Olav H. Hauge: Trust Your Life to Water and Eternity. 1987
 Kjell Sandvik: Sang til Finnmark. 1989.
 Environmental Consequences of Deep Seabed Mining. 1991
 Challenges of a Changing World.  1991
 Proceedings from the Northern Sea Route Expert Meeting. 1992
 Tore Skoglund: Draugen, hevneren fra havet. 1992
 Per Fugelli: Doktor på Værøy og Røst; Lege på Utrøst. 2006

References

20th-century Norwegian painters
Norwegian illustrators
People from Surnadal
1907 births
1994 deaths